In addition to developing the C-101 and C-301 supersonic anti-ship missiles which are fairly large in size, China has developed FL-7 (FL: Fei Long, meaning Flying Dragon) supersonic anti-ship missile which can be carried on airplanes and warships. The Feilong-7 has an effective range of 32 kilometers and a speed of Mach 1.4. It has powerful anti-jamming capability and its supersonic flight makes terminal interception difficult. The warhead of the FL-7 can pierce solid armor and destroy large and medium-sized surface warships. This missile can be roughly considered as the supersonic counterpart of the subsonic C-704 anti-ship missile.  The missile is powered by a liquid fuel rocket motor and a solid rocket booster, which is under the airframe at the rear.

Along with C-101, FL-7 competed for the air-launched supersonic anti-ship missile program in China during the 1990s.  However, C-101 was selected because it flies at faster speed and its range is nearly a third greater than that of FL-7, while it only weighs slightly heavier.  Being the last Chinese anti-ship missile with rocket motor powered by liquid fuel, the role of FL-7 is decreasing, but not yet immediately phased out.  The reason is that the Chinese coastal defense doctrine when using anti-ship missiles: multi-direction, multi-altitude, multiple waves attacks on targets with both supersonic and subsonic anti-ship missiles to make it difficult for the targets to defend itself from such saturated attacks, FL-7 is thus still have a little role to play in such saturated attacks at shorter range.  However, it is safe to conclude that as newer missiles becoming widely available, the role of FL-7 would continuously decrease to its eventual retirement.

Western sources have claimed in 1996, with Chinese help in the forms of technology sales, that Iran had begun indigenous production of a medium-range anti-ship missile, based on the technologies of FL-7.

Length: 6.59 m
Diameter: 0.54 m
Weight: 1,770 kg
Wingspan: 1.86 m
Warhead: 360 kg
Speed: > Mach 1.4
Range: 32 km max.
Guidance:  active radar homing seeker (Other types of seekers being developed)
Propulsion: one liquid rocket engine with a solid rocket booster

References
FL-7
FL(Feilong-7)

Anti-ship cruise missiles of the People's Republic of China
Weapons of the People's Republic of China
Air-to-surface missiles
Anti-tank guided missiles of the People's Republic of China
Military equipment introduced in the 1980s